Lavitah Mountain, is a  mountain in the Miscinchinka Ranges of the Hart Ranges in the Northern Rocky Mountains.

Several recreational projects have been proposed for the mountain, none of which have moved forward past very preliminary studies.  A private, members only ski area was first proposed in the mid-2000's followed by the Pine Pass Mountain Top Community, a four-season resort studied in 2012. The 2018 District of Mackenzie Recreation Trails Master Plan identified the mountain as a potential backcountry ski area. 

In 2012 the mountain was also studied as a potential location for a wind farm project, although further development has yet to occur.

Hydrology 
Lavitah Mountain is the source for two small creeks.  Caswell Creek on the south face and an unnamed tributary of Honeymoon Creek on the north face

References 

Canadian Rockies
Northern Interior of British Columbia
One-thousanders of British Columbia
Cariboo Land District